Bordesley Abbey was a 12th-century Cistercian abbey  near the town of Redditch, in Worcestershire, England.
 
The abbey's foundation was an act of Waleran de Beaumont, Count of Meulan, who gave the monks of Garendon Abbey in Leicestershire some more land. However, Empress Matilda laid claim to the patronage of Bordesley once Waleran surrendered to her in about 1141, thus making Bordesley a royal house.

Bordesley Abbey was once an important local ecclesiastical centre, holding political control of the ancient township of Tardebigge. It was demolished by Henry VIII during the dissolution of the monasteries in 1538 and the property was sold.

The ruins are now an archaeological site, undergoing investigation since 1969 by the University of Reading's Bordesley Abbey Project. Many of the excavated items can be seen in a visitor centre and museum at the site, which is joined with the Forge Mill Needle Museum. Guy de Beauchamp, 10th Earl of Warwick, was buried in the Abbey.

Description
The abbey is located in the borough of Redditch in Worcestershire, on the south bank of the River Arrow, close to where it meets the Batchley Brook. Archaeological findings by the University of Reading's Bordesley Abbey Project indicate that the abbey's focus was the church building, located on a hill, with its western side embedded within the slope. This location made it prone to slipping and buttresses were added to support the building. Piers were added for extra support in the 13th century, and again in the 14th, following a major collapse. The abbey was the burial place of Guy de Beauchamp, 10th Earl of Warwick, whose family had been among its benefactors.

The ruins of the abbey today consist of visible earthworks and walls, and parts buried underground such as the watermill and workshops. The site is managed by the Forge Mill Needle Museum, which provides access to the abbey ruin, included within its entry fee as well as guided tours. The abbey has been designated by Historic England as a scheduled monument since 1957.

History

Bordeseley Abbey was founded during a period known as The Anarchy, a breakdown in law and order which followed the disputed accession of Stephen, King of England. Historians generally date the founding of the abbey to 1138, when Waleran de Beaumont, Count of Meulan and Worcester filed a charter for the site. But an alternative charter by Queen Maud was recorded in the Winchcombe Annals, dated 1136 and witnessed by Waleran himself. After the Battle of Lincoln in 1141, Waleran switched allegiance from Stephen to Maud and it is possible that he renounced his own right to the abbey at that time, in deference to Maud.

The abbey was set up by Waleran as a monastery for a group of Cistercian monks, previously based at Garendon Abbey in Leicestershire. The designated area, located in the valley of the River Arrow, was predominantly marshland at the time and the monks had to drain the land and divert the river to make it suitable for building. The earliest buildings on the site were wooden, with stone constructions being built a few years later. The first part of the abbey to be completed was the church, completed in around 1150, with subsequent building taking place predominantly during five distinct periods up to the early 14th century. The abbey acquired considerable land-holdings in the area, on which it farmed produce such as cereal and wool for sale. In the 13th century a gatehouse and chapel were built at the west end of the precinct. This chapel, the chapel of St Stephen, survived the Dissolution and continued to be used by the parish; it was demolished in 1805 when a new church was built in the centre of Redditch town.

The abbey closed on 17 July 1538 during the dissolution of the monasteries under King Henry VIII, when its final abbot, John Day, surrendered the land and possessions to the king. The land was sold by Henry on 23 September 1538.

Burials
Guy de Beauchamp, 10th Earl of Warwick

See also
Bordesley, Worcestershire

References

Bibliography

Walsh, D. (Redditch: Forge Mill Museum Trust Ltd., 1984) p. 1

External links
Bordesley Abbey Official Web Site, including visitor details
The Bordesley Abbey Project at the University of Reading
Visitor guide to Bordesley Abbey

Monasteries in Worcestershire
Cistercian monasteries in England
12th-century establishments in England
1538 disestablishments in England
Redditch
Demolished buildings and structures in England
Buildings and structures demolished in the 16th century

es:Abadía de Bordesley#top